Mullaghbawn (  or), or Mullaghbane, is a small village and townland near Slieve Gullion in County Armagh, Northern Ireland. In the 2011 Census it had a population of 596.

History
A barracks was built near Mullaghbawn in 1689 and was known as Shanroe Barracks. The building was a small outpost build to help to suppress the activities of the rapparees and eventually abandoned in 1750. Forkill rectory was built in 1775 in the townland of Shanroe nearer the village of Mullaghbane. This meant that the rector had to travel almost two miles from his home to his church in Forkhill on foot or on horseback. The outbreak of sectarian violence between the Peep o' Day Boys and the Catholic Defenders in the Mulllaghbane and Forkill areas in the 1780s and early 1790s meant that a new barracks was required to house a company of foot soldiers. Belmont Barracks was later built overlooking the site of the rectory in 1795. The Forkhill Yeomanry was formed when the barracks was opened. By 1821 Belmont Barracks had become obsolete and was sold. The main barracks building remains is currently two private homes. The rectory ceased to be occupied by 1920 and was burned by the local IRA in 1922 before it was to be taken over by British forces. The remains of the Rectory's ruined gatehouse is still standing along a laneway to the right on the road from the village to Belmont.

Mullaghbawn, along with the rest of South Armagh, would have been transferred to the Irish Free State had the recommendations of the Irish Boundary Commission been enacted in 1925.

Places of interest 

 The community  centre 
 Near Mullaghbawn, in Killeavy there is a ruined church with the grave of Saint Moninne (a local saint) in its churchyard.
 Ballykeel Dolmen is near Mullaghbawn at the western foot of Slieve Gullion. It is an outstanding example of a portal tomb. It is made up of two portal stones with a sill between and a lower backstone supporting a huge capstone.
Cashel Lake, a group of lakes on the outskirts of Mullaghbawn.
The South Armagh Memorial Garden in Mullaghbawn, created in 2010, commemorates 24 Provisional IRA volunteers who died during the Troubles.

Culture and sport 
Mullaghbawn Folk Museum is a traditional two-roomed thatched farmhouse and outbuildings, restored by the Mullaghbawn Historical Group during the 1970s and filled with artefacts depicting the lifestyles of the people of the Ring of Gullion in the last century.

Tí Chulainn is a cultural heritage centre, with accommodation and function rooms, set at the bottom of Slieve Gullion.

The local GAA club is Mullaghbawn Cúchullain's GFC (Cumann Chú Chullain, An Mullach Bán).

People
 Len Graham, Irish traditional singer and song collector, lives in the village with his wife Pádraigín Ní Uallacháin, also a singer.
 Paddy O'Hanlon (1944-2009), Northern Ireland Civil Rights Association (NICRA) activist and nationalist politician,  lived most of his life in Mullaghbawn.

Neighbouring townlands 
 Aughanduff
 Carrickaldreen
 Carrive
 Lathbirget
 Lislea
 Shanroe
 Tullymacrieve

References

Links
 Mullaghbawn Folk Museum

Villages in County Armagh
Townlands of County Armagh